In enzymology, a 3-deoxyoctulosonase is an enzyme that catalyzes the chemical reaction

3-deoxyoctulosonyl-lipopolysaccharide + H2O  3-deoxyoctulosonic acid + lipopolysaccharide

Thus, the two substrates of this enzyme are 3-deoxyoctulosonyl-lipopolysaccharide and H2O, whereas its two products are 3-deoxyoctulosonic acid and lipopolysaccharide.

This enzyme belongs to the family of hydrolases, specifically those glycosidases that hydrolyse O- and S-glycosyl compounds.  The systematic name of this enzyme class is 3-deoxyoctulosonyl-lipopolysaccharide hydrolase. This enzyme is also called alpha-Kdo-ase.

References 

 

EC 3.2.1
Enzymes of unknown structure